Lieutenant General John William Parnell,  (6 March 1860 – 8 July 1931) was an Australian soldier who served during the First World War and Administrator of Norfolk Island.

John was only son of Edwin Parnell, teacher, and his wife Olivia,  Higginbotham. He attended All Saints Grammar School and later at Wesley College.

Parnell was appointed commandant of the Royal Military College, Duntroon, just prior to the First World War in 1914. He remained as the commandant during the course of the war finishing his posting in 1920.

He was the administrator of Norfolk Island from 1 September 1920 until resigning the position, due to ill health in April 1924. He died on 8 July 1931, his wife Ida and his youngest daughter Mary surviving him. Three children predeceased him.

References

Further reading
 Chris Clark, 'Parnell, John William (1860–1931)', Australian Dictionary of Biography, National Centre of Biography, Australian National University, 1988.

1860 births
1931 deaths
Australian generals
Australian military personnel of World War I
Military personnel from Melbourne
People educated at Wesley College (Victoria)
Burials at Melbourne General Cemetery
Administrators of Norfolk Island
Australian Companions of the Order of St Michael and St George
Australian Officers of the Order of the British Empire